Yuri Sergeyevich Entin (born 21 August 1935) is a Russian and Soviet poet, playwright, and lyricist who wrote screenplays and songs for various children's films including  The Bremen Town Musicians (1969) and two sequels (with Vasily Livanov) and Blue Puppy (1976), among others. He also wrote music with Bulat Okudzhava for the 1975 film The Adventures of Buratino.

Biography
Entin was born in Moscow. He was interested in literature and history during his school years. He graduated from the Faculty of History and worked as a teacher and librarian. In 1962 he was the Chief Editor of the children's section of the company "Melody". Since 1969 he has been a freelance artist. He has written songs for film, television, scripts, and books. In 1998 the poet was awarded the professional award " Golden Ostap "in the" Humor for children. "
In 2004 celebrated the 35th anniversary of his creative activity, prepared and held 20 February 2004 in the Kremlin huge musical evening at the old and new songs.
Yuri – a member of the Union of Cinematographers of Russia , author of poems set of songs (over 500). Songs on his poems sound in a variety of children's and adult movies (more than 100). Has written several books for children.
Many of the songs from the movies and animated films have become hits through poetry Yuri Entin: "June 31", "The Adventures of Pinocchio", "Property of the Republic", "The Guest from the Future", "Oh, this Nastya", "Dunno from our yard", "The Adventures of Electronics", "The Bremen Town Musicians" and "Traces of the Bremen Town Musicians", "Cutter", "The Flying Ship", "Blue Puppy", "Well, wait a minute!" . His songs are known both to children and adults, and phrases from songs became winged "Nobody stays with me ...", "Such-and-so ran away from the palace," "Whack Whack, gotovenkogo carried away", "my best gift – it's you ... "and many others.
Union repeatedly became the winner of the contest "Song of the Year" with the songs "Forest deer", "Winged swing", "Uch-kuduk – three wells," "Hey, Slavs!".
For several years (1995–1997) was an author and a leading child transmission Chunga-Changa on Channel One, which was also the creator of Stanislav Mitin .
Wrote the music for the song Gennady Gladkov, Rybnikov, Vladimir Shainsky, Eugene Krylatov, Marc Minkowski, David Tukhmanov .
Ability to instant improvisation became the hallmark of Yuri Entin. Not just with situations where work required urgently finalize – and he managed to come up with a verse or phrase that not only complements the image, but later became a cruise.
Works by Yuri Entin often criticized in the Arts Council refused permission to publish and broadcast on television and radio. Objections caused even innocuous wording: "Oh, early bird protection", "Oh, my life, tin! I live as a toadstool "," Miracle-island, live on it is easy and simple. " Some works are able to defend, others had to alter or postpone for the future.

Works
Cartoons
1967 "Four from one yard" ("Soyuzmultfilm"), music. Gennnady Gladkov
1969 "The Bremen Town Musicians" ("Soyuzmultfilm"), music. Gennady Gladkov
1969 "Merry Go Round. Issue number 1 " ("Soyuzmultfilm"), music. Vladimir Shainsky
1970 "Cutter" ("Soyuzmultfilm"), music. Vladimir Shainsky (song Chunga-Changa )
1970 "Beavers are on the trail" ("Soyuzmultfilm"), music. Vladimir  Shainsky
1970 "Small misunderstandings (Kotick Motik)" ("Screen"), music. Vladimir Shainsky
1970 "Malyshok and black mask" ("Screen"), music. Anatoly Bykanov 
1972 "The Edge, where you live" ("Soyuzmultfilm"), music. Gennady  Gladkov
1972 "Where do you fly, Vitar?" ("Soyuzmultfilm"), music. Oscar Felzman
1973 "Song of Friendship" ("Soyuzmultfilm"), music. Vladimir Shainsky
1973 "In the wake of the Bremen Town Musicians" ("Soyuzmultfilm"), music. Gene. Gladkov
1973 "Spider Anansi and the Magic Wand" ("Screen"), music. Alexey Rybnikov
1973 "Index" ("Soyuzmultfilm"), music. Rybnikov
1974 "A Tale for the fairy tale" : "Peter – cheerful deceiver" ("Soyuzmultfilm"), music. Yevgeny Krylatov
1974 Oh, wait! (Issue 1) ("Soyuzmultfilm"), music. Gene. Gladkov
1974 "Katavasov" ("Screen"), music. Yadav
1975 "The Wolf and the Seven Little Kids in a new way" ("Screen"), music. Alexey Rybnikov
1976 "Blue Puppy" ("Soyuzmultfilm"), music. Gennady Gladkov
1979 "The Flying Ship" ("Soyuzmultfilm"), music. Maksim Dunayevsky
1980 "Bang bang, oh-oh-oh!" ("Screen"), music. Maksim Dunayevsky
1980 "Baba Yaga against!" ("Soyuzmultfilm"), music. Eduard Artemyev
1982 "Before we were birds"
1984 "Winter in Buttermilk" ("Soyuzmultfilm"), music. Yevgeny Krylatov
1984 "Creme Brulee" ("Screen"), music. Vladimir Nazarov
1985 – in 1987 "Contact and Conflict", issues number 2, 3 ("Soyuzmultfilm"), music. Pavel Ovsyannikov 
1989 "The Cage" ("Soyuzmultfilm"), music. Gennady Gladkov
1990 "End Gray Wolf Little Red Riding Hood" ("Soyuzmultfilm"), music. Georgy Garanian
1992 "Yoksel-Moksel" ("Reneshans") muses. David Tukhmanov 
1996 "Frog-traveler" ("Animafilm") muses. Yevgeny Krylatov
2000 "The New Bremen Town Musicians" ("Kino-Bridge"), music. Gennady  Gladkov
2002 "Firefly", muses. David Tukhmanov 
2002 "The New Adventures of Pencil and Tuneup" ("Pro-Class"), music  David Tukhmanov 
2003 "Guilty cloud", muses. David Tuhmanov 
2004 "Strahodon Shaggy" ("Studio Light"), music. David Tukhmanov
2002 – 2004 "Birdie", "Roly-poly", "Aerobics for Bobik", "Beloved Papa", "Brave Bunny", "Guilty cloud", "The Lazy Song" (Studio "Ladybird"), music. David Tukhmanov 
"School with a bias" Moldova-film music. Ostrowska
"Sesame Street", an animated series, USA, muses  Vladimir Shainsky

References

External links
 
 Entin.ru — Официальный сайт Ю. С. Энтина
 Юрий Энтин — Энциклопедия отчественного кино

1935 births
Living people
Writers from Moscow
Communist Party of the Soviet Union members
Russian lyricists
20th-century Russian poets
Russian male poets
20th-century Russian screenwriters
20th-century Russian male writers
Soviet songwriters
Soviet screenwriters
Male screenwriters